Kumlah Island is a small, uninhabited island in British Columbia, Canada.  It is located south of Gilford Island in the waters of Tribune Channel.

Islands of British Columbia
Central Coast of British Columbia